This article contains a list of named passenger trains in the United States with names beginning with C.

List

See also
 Lists of named passenger trains

References

North America (C)
 C
Named passenger trains